Naga Ultimate Kuala Selangor Football Club  or simply Naga UKS is a Malaysian professional football club based in Kuala Selangor, Selangor. They currently play in the second division of Malaysian football, the Malaysia M3 League.

History
Ultimate Football Club was founded in 2014 in Klang Valley, and has first participated in several local football competitions.

In 2018, the club has won the AXA Klang Valley League after defeating Gombak FA 3–2, thus beeing eligible to compete in the Malaysia M3 League.

In 2019, the club competed in the Malaysia FA Cup for the first time.

Crest and colours

 first logo (2014–2022)

Season by season record

Notes:   2020 Season cancelled due to the COVID-19 pandemic, no promotion or league title was awarded.

Players
First-team squad

Management team
Club personnel

Honours
Domestic competitions
LeagueAXA Klang Valley League  Winners (1)' : 2018

References

Malaysia M3 League
Football clubs in Malaysia
Sport in Selangor